Portola is the only incorporated city in Plumas County, California, United States. The population was 2,104 at the 2010 census, down from 2,227 at the 2000 census. Portola is located on the Middle Fork of the Feather River and was named after Spanish explorer Gaspar de Portolá, although he did not explore this area.

Portola is a crew change site on the Western Pacific Railroad (now Union Pacific Railroad) Feather River Route over the Sierra Nevada. The city is also home to the Western Pacific Railroad Museum (formerly Portola Railroad Museum), one of the largest railroad museums in the Western United States. The museum is famous for its Run A Locomotive program, where the public can participate in a "fantasy experience" program allowing them to run a railroad locomotive on the museum grounds.

Portola was in the national media spotlight in 1996–1997 when a conflict occurred between the local community and the Department of Fish and Game over how to deal with an invasive species of northern pike in Lake Davis. The lake was chemically treated in 1997 to eradicate the fish, but they reappeared in 1999. In early September 2007, the California Department of Fish and Game eradicated the pike using CFT Legumine, a new liquid formulation of rotenone.

Geography and climate

Portola lies on the Middle Fork of the Feather River in the Sierra Nevada mountain range. The headwaters of the Middle Fork of the Feather River originate just east of Portola in Sierra Valley, near Beckwourth.

About  to the west and southwest of Portola, Plumas-Eureka State Park and Lakes Basin Recreation Area feature granite peaks, glacial lakes, streams, and temperate coniferous forests, which make them popular destinations for outdoor enthusiasts.

Being on the eastern slopes of the Sierra Nevada, Portola has a continental Mediterranean climate (Köppen: Dsb) with dry summers characterized by extreme diurnal temperature swings, and cold (though not severe) and snowy winters. Frosts occur on 218 mornings per year. Extreme cold is rare and temperatures below  are observed on only 2.6 mornings per winter in an average year.

Demographics

2010
The 2010 United States Census reported that Portola had a population of 2,104. The racial makeup of Portola was 1,762 (83.7%) White, 13 (0.6%) African American, 54 (2.6%) Native American, 12 (0.6%) Asian, 1 (0.0%) Pacific Islander, 198 (9.4%) from other races, and 64 (3.0%) from two or more races. Hispanic or Latino of any race were 342 persons (16.3%).

The Census reported that 2,080 people (98.9% of the population) lived in households, 0 (0%) lived in non-institutionalized group quarters, and 24 (1.1%) were institutionalized.

There were 887 households, out of which 278 (31.3%) had children under the age of 18 living in them, 378 (42.6%) were opposite-sex married couples living together, 114 (12.9%) had a female householder with no husband present, 53 (6.0%) had a male householder with no wife present.  There were 68 (7.7%) unmarried opposite-sex partnerships, and 4 (0.5%) same-sex married couples or partnerships. 286 households (32.2%) were made up of individuals, and 113 (12.7%) had someone living alone who was 65 years of age or older. The average household size was 2.34.  There were 545 families (61.4% of all households); the average family size was 2.92.

The population was spread out, with 502 people (23.9%) under the age of 18, 198 people (9.4%) aged 18 to 24, 462 people (22.0%) aged 25 to 44, 638 people (30.3%) aged 45 to 64, and 304 people (14.4%) who were 65 years of age or older.  The median age was 39.8 years. For every 100 females, there were 93.4 males.  For every 100 females age 18 and over, there were 89.8 males.

The homeowner vacancy rate was 6.8%; the rental vacancy rate was 21.0%.  1,156 people (54.9% of the population) lived in owner-occupied housing units and 924 people (43.9%) lived in rental housing units.

2000
As of the census of 2000, there were 2,227 people, 899 households, and 595 families residing in the city. The racial makeup of the city was 86.21% White, 0.45% African American, 2.65% Native American, 1.08% Asian, 0.09% Pacific Islander, 5.84% from other races, and 3.68% from two or more races. Hispanic or Latino of any race were 11.81% of the population.

There were 899 households, out of which 36.7% had children under the age of 18 living with them, 48.2% were married couples living together, 11.7% had a female householder with no husband present, and 33.8% were non-families. 29.0% of all households were made up of individuals, and 12.6% had someone living alone who was 65 years of age or older.  The average household size was 2.45 and the average family size was 3.02.

In the city, the age distribution of the population shows 29.5% under the age of 18, 7.3% from 18 to 24, 26.0% from 25 to 44, 23.8% from 45 to 64, and 13.5% who were 65 years of age or older.  The median age was 37 years. For every 100 females, there were 97.1 males.  For every 100 females age 18 and over, there were 92.1 males.

The median income for a household in the city was $28,103, and the median income for a family was $35,156. Males had a median income of $32,159 versus $21,157 for females. The per capita income for the city was $14,734.  About 14.5% of families and 20.3% of the population were below the poverty line, including 28.7% of those under age 18 and 5.4% of those age 65 or over.

Government
The city is governed by a five-member council.  Council members serve staggered four-year terms. The council chooses the mayor and mayor pro tem.

References

External links
 
 Portola Reporter - Local newspaper
 Feather River Rail Society
 Western Pacific Railroad Museum at Portola
 Article about the Portola Railroad Museum
 http://www.portolarailroaddays.com
 http://www.discoverplumascounty.com
 https://www.easternplumaschamber.com

Portola
Portola
Populated places in the Sierra Nevada (United States)
Portola